The Type 096 is a projected class of ballistic missile submarine (SSBN) for China's People's Liberation Army Navy Submarine Force. The submarine is expected to begin construction in the early 2020s and be armed with the JL-3 SLBM.

See also
 People's Liberation Army Navy Submarine Force

References

Submarines of the People's Liberation Army Navy
Submarine classes
Ballistic missile submarines
Nuclear program of the People's Republic of China
Nuclear-powered submarines
Nuclear submarines of the Chinese Navy